Roxey Fer (born 15 November 1994) is a Surinamese association footballer who currently plays for S.V. Robinhood  and for the Suriname national football team.

Career

Fer made his debut for Suriname in a friendly against Guyana as a 13th-minute substitute. His first goal for Suriname would come during 2018 FIFA World Cup qualification in a second leg 3-1 loss to Nicaragua who would go on to win 4-1 on aggregate.
Fer was known for his aggressive behaviors on the pitch receiving many yellow and red cards.

International Goals
Scores and results list Suriname's goal tally first.

Personal life

Roxey has a younger brother Donnegy Fer who played for rival club Transvaal and currently plays for Inter Moengotapoe.

Honours

Club
Robinhood
Eerste Divisie: 2017-2018
Beker van Suriname: 2016, 2018
President's Cup: 2016, 2018
Caribbean Club Shield: 2019

References

External links
Roxey Fer at EuroSport
Caribbean Football Database profile

1994 births
Living people
Surinamese footballers
Suriname international footballers
SVB Eerste Divisie players
S.V. Robinhood players
S.V. Voorwaarts players
Association football midfielders